65 Squadron or 65th Squadron may refer to:

 No. 65 Squadron RAF, a unit of the United Kingdom Royal Air Force
 No. 65 Squadron RAAF, a unit of the Royal Australian Air Force 
 65th Aggressor Squadron, a unit of the United States Air Force 
 65th Airlift Squadron, a unit of the United States Air Force

See also
 65th Division (disambiguation)
 65th Regiment (disambiguation)